New York State Route 179 (NY 179) is a short  long state highway located south of Buffalo in Erie County, New York, in the United States. It is a four-lane divided road (albeit with traffic lights) for most of its length. It is known as Mile Strip Road. A small section between U.S. Route 62 (US 62) and NY 5 in Blasdell, however, is a limited-access highway known as the Mile Strip Expressway. It connects to two major expressways, the New York State Thruway (Interstate 90 or I-90) and the Southern Expressway (US 219), by way of interchanges. It serves as a connector road between them and three other major routes, NY 5, US 62, and US 20. Thus it is very busy not only at rush hours, but also after Buffalo Bills' home football games due to its proximity to Ralph Wilson Stadium.

The Mile Strip Expressway was first constructed in the 1960s from NY 5 in Hamburg to US 62 in Blasdell. By 1968, it received its NY 179 designation. This was extended to the Thruway in the next decade and by 2001, was extended to its current eastern terminus at US 20 in Orchard Park. Although never constructed as such, the Mile Strip was intended to be a portion of the Belt Expressway, an outer loop for the city of Buffalo.

Route description

NY 179 begins at an interchange with NY 5 (Lake Shore Road) near the shores Lake Erie in Woodlawn Beach State Park. NY 179 proceeds eastward through the town of Hamburg as the Mile Strip Expressway, running north as a four-lane boulevard north of a stamping plant, operated by the Ford Motor Company. Just after the stamping plant, NY 179 enters its first interchange, Mile Strip Road, which connects to NY 179 east via a jughandle. Crossing into the town of Blasdell, the expressway crosses over three separate railroad grades  consecutively before crossing into downtown Blasdell. In Blasdell, another railroad crosses the freeway after an interchange with Jeffrey Boulevard. A short distance later, NY 179 intersects with US 62 (South Park Avenue), where the expressway ends and NY 179 becomes the four-lane arterial boulevard known as Mile Strip Road.

After re-crossing into Hamburg, NY 179 continues eastward as Mile Strip Road, entering a large interchange with the New York State Thruway (I-90 exit 56), which connects via trumpet interchange. After bending northeast, the route crosses over the Thruway, becoming a two-lane commercial street, passing north and south of several strip malls until an intersection with County Route 204 (CR 204; McKinley Parkway). After CR 204, NY 179 passes north of McKinley Mall, proceeding eastward as a four-lane divided boulevard past several residences before bending northeast, intersecting with CR 4 (Abbott Road) in the town of Orchard Park.

After CR 4, NY 179 proceeds east through Orchard Park as a two-lane boulevard, intersecting the northern terminus of CR 461 (California Road). After crossing under another railroad, NY 179 returns to four-lanes, passing south of several strip malls in Orchard Park. The route soon becomes a divided highway, entering a cloverleaf interchange with US 219 (the Southern Expressway). After the interchange, NY 179 parallels as a four-lane boulevard between several strip malls, soon intersecting with US 20 (Southwestern Boulevard), where NY 179 terminates. CR 460 continues eastward along Mile Strip Road to NY 187.

History
The Mile Strip Expressway, a  highway extending from NY 5 to US 62, was constructed in the mid-1960s and designated as NY 179 by 1968. A short continuation of the expressway east of US 62 providing direct access to New York State Thruway exit 56 was opened to traffic as an extension of NY 179 at some point in the late 1970s or early 1980s. The junction between the expressway and Mile Strip Road was initially a four-way intersection, with Mile Strip Road passing east–west through the intersection and NY 179 entering from the south to connect to Thruway exit 56 to the north.

The entirety of Mile Strip Road east of US 62 was initially maintained by Erie County as CR 460. The intersection between NY 179 and US 62 was originally planned as an overpass, but was later constructed as an at-grade intersection. By 2001, the junction between NY 179, Mile Strip Road, and the Thruway was reconfigured into its current design and NY 179 was extended east to its current terminus at US 20. CR 460 was then truncated to US 20 on its western end, transferring maintenance of Mile Strip Road from the Thruway to US 20 to the New York State Department of Transportation.

The Mile Strip Expressway was to be part of the Belt Expressway, an outer loop connecting Buffalo and Niagara Falls. This plan was ultimately cancelled. The only two portions of the loop that were constructed are the LaSalle Expressway east of Niagara Falls and the mile-long Mile Strip Expressway.

Major intersections

See also

References

External links

179
Transportation in Erie County, New York
Limited-access roads in New York (state)